Daytona Rush Soccer Club was an American soccer club competing in the USL League Two. The team finished in third in the Southern Division in their only season with a 7-3-4 record. They were owned by Rush Sports, who also backed three other USL2 sides - Cedar Stars Rush, Colorado Rush SC, Virginia Beach United.

Year-by-year

References

External links
 

USL League Two teams
2019 establishments in Florida
2021 establishments in Florida
Association football clubs established in 2019
Association football clubs disestablished in 2021
Sports in Daytona Beach, Florida
Soccer clubs in Florida